Vicky Grau Muxella (born 8 April 1975) is an Andorran alpine skier. She competed at the 1992, 1994, 1998 and the 2002 Winter Olympics.

She is the sister of alpine skier Sandra Grau.

Notes

References

External links
 
 
 

1975 births
Living people
Andorran female alpine skiers
Olympic alpine skiers of Andorra
Alpine skiers at the 1992 Winter Olympics
Alpine skiers at the 1994 Winter Olympics
Alpine skiers at the 1998 Winter Olympics
Alpine skiers at the 2002 Winter Olympics
Place of birth missing (living people)